The Humarathon is an annual half marathon road running event which takes place between Ivry-sur-Seine and Vitry-sur-Seine in France every Easter Weekend (usually April). First held in 1986, the race settled on the Ivry- to Vitry-sur-Seine route in the Val-de-Marne department in 1988. The competition also includes a 10K run in its programme of events.

From its first edition, the race attracted international athletes and the winning times throughout its running have been of a high standard. The course records were both set in 2011: Dino Sefir set the men's best of 59:42 minutes and Sarah Chepchirchir improved the women's record to 1:08:07 hours. The Association of Road Racing Statisticians questions the validity of these marks, indicating a short course or wind-assistance, and recognises the best times for the race as Paul Koech's 1996 run of 1:00:31 hours and Mary Keitany's 2007 time of 1:08:36 hours.

The half marathon has a clockwise, circular route which starts near the Parc des Cormailles, heads east to follow the River Seine southwards, goes west through the town of Vitry, turns north on Boulevard de Stalingrad, and then returns east to the Town Hall at Ivry. Around 2000 runners took part in the half marathon event in 2012.

Among the athletes to have competed and won at the race are 1996 Olympic marathon champion Fatuma Roba, the 2002 European Championships marathon winner Maria Guida, 2004 World Half Marathon Champion Paul Kirui, half marathon world record holder Mary Keitany, two-time World Half Marathon runner-up Hendrick Ramaala and three-time World's Best 10k winner Sammy Kitwara.

In 2016 the half-marathon was cancelled to allow the organisers to focus on the charitable aspects of the event.

Past winners

Key:

References

List of winners
Civai, Franco et al. (2012-04-16). Humarathon. Association of Road Racing Statisticians. Retrieved on 2013-04-10.

External links
Official website 

Half marathons in France
Sport in Val-de-Marne
Recurring sporting events established in 1986
Annual sporting events in France
1986 establishments in France
Spring (season) events in France